Group 1 of UEFA Euro 1992 was one of only two groups in the final tournament's initial group stage. It began on 10 June and was completed on 17 June. The group consisted of hosts Sweden, fellow Scandinavians Denmark, France and England.

In the opening game between Sweden and France, Sweden took the lead with a Jan Eriksson header from a corner; France equalised in the second half with a right-footed shot from Jean-Pierre Papin. The Denmark–England and France–England games both ended scoreless, although John Jensen hit the post for Denmark against England, and Stuart Pearce did likewise for England against France, before Sweden defeated Denmark 1–0. In the last two games, England played Sweden and took the lead in the first half when David Platt volleyed in from a cross. In the second half, Sweden came back to win with another Jan Eriksson header from a corner and a shot from Thomas Brolin from the edge of the box after a one-two with Martin Dahlin. Gary Lineker was taken off in the second half of the game, replaced by Alan Smith; it was his last game for England (and, as it turned out, Smith's as well), and he was withdrawn with half an hour to go despite the fact that, regardless of how the other match finished (at the time both games were at 1-1), England would need at least one more goal - a third draw would not be enough - and Lineker was England's second-highest goalscorer in history, and moreover had provided the cross for Platt's goal. In the concurrent match, Denmark also scored a late goal, beating France 2–1 to take the second spot in the knockout stage.

Sweden won the group and advanced to the semi-finals along with Denmark. France and England were eliminated. England's manager Graham Taylor was greeted by the famous newspaper headline "SWEDES 2 TURNIPS 1", with his face superimposed on a picture of a turnip. Lineker, who had previously announced his intention to retire after the tournament, did so.

Teams

Notes

Standings

In the semi-finals,
The winner of Group 1, Sweden, advanced to play the runner-up of Group 2, Germany.
The runner-up of Group 1, Denmark, advanced to play the winner of Group 2, Netherlands.

Matches

Sweden vs France

Denmark vs England

France vs England

Sweden vs Denmark

Sweden vs England

France vs Denmark

See also
Denmark–Sweden football rivalry

References

External links
UEFA Euro 1992 Group 1

Group 1
Group
Group
Group
Group
Denmark–Sweden football rivalry